Portrait of Teresa is a 1979 Cuban drama film directed by Pastor Vega. It was entered into the 11th Moscow International Film Festival, where Daisy Granados won the award for Best Actress.

Cast
 Idalia Anreus
 Miguel Benavides
 Samuel Claxton
 Elsa Gay
 Daisy Granados as Teresa
 Adolfo Llauradó as Ramón
 Germán Pinelli
 Raúl Pomares
 Alina Sánchez

See also 
 List of Cuban films

References

External links
 

1979 films
1979 drama films
1970s Spanish-language films
Cuban drama films